Calum Chace (born 20 March 1959) is an English writer and speaker, focusing on the likely future impact of Artificial Intelligence on people and societies.

He is the author of Surviving AI, The Economic Singularity, and the philosophical science fiction novels Pandora's Brain, and its sequel, Pandora's Oracle.

Education 
Chace studied at Maidstone Grammar School in Kent, England. He later studied philosophy, politics, and economics (PPE) at Oxford University. His interest in AI stems from his reading of science fiction, which he describes as philosophy in fancy dress.

Career 
Prior to becoming a full-time writer and speaker in 2012, Chace had a 30-year career in journalism and business. He trained as a journalist with the BBC, and later he wrote a column for the FT.  He is now a contributor to Forbes magazine. He moved into business, and ran a media practice at KPMG before serving as director and CEO for a number of entrepreneurial businesses.

He has published five books on Artificial Intelligence.

In 2017, Chace co-founded the Economic Singularity Club, "a loose group of technologists, academics and writers who think the threat of mass technological unemployment is worth taking seriously". In January 2019 the group published Stories from 2045, a collection of short stories by some of its members speculating on what the world might look like in 2045.

Publications

Talks 
In July 2019, Chace was listed among the top 50 futurist speakers in the world.

Economic Singularity 
 
Chace describes the economic singularity as the time when technological unemployment becomes a reality.  He argues that "it is at least a serious possibility that within a generation, many or even most people will be unemployable because machines will be able to do whatever they could do for money better, cheaper and faster. We should be taking this possibility seriously and working out what we would do about it."

“In the past, automation hasn’t caused lasting unemployment and has raised the level of wealth in the economy and created new jobs, but past examples of automation have replaced our muscle power and we had our cognitive abilities.” So what will happen when robots automate our cognitive work?   "When they start seeing cars driving around with no one driving them, people will realise how impressive computers are. If we don't have a plan, people will panic."

“I think our best hope going forward is figuring out how to live in an economy of radical abundance, where machines do all the work, and we basically play.”   “A world where machines do all the jobs could be a world where humans do more important things, like playing, learning and having fun, but paying for that is going to be tricky.”

External Links
Website

References

Living people
Place of birth missing (living people)
English science fiction writers
1959 births